Abdulrahman Al-Ajlan is a Saudi Arabian football player who currently plays as a forward .

External links
Eurosport.fr Profile 
FootballDatabase.eu Profile
Goal.com Profile
slstat.com Profile

1986 births
Living people
Saudi Arabian footballers
Al Nassr FC players
Sdoos Club players
Al-Hamadah Club players
Al-Shoulla FC players
Al-Kawkab FC players
Al-Hazem F.C. players
Al-Sharq Club players
Al-Muzahimiyyah Club players
Saudi First Division League players
Saudi Professional League players
Saudi Second Division players
Association football forwards